Conor Stakelum is an Irish hurler who plays for club side Thurles Sarsfields and at inter-county level with the Tipperary senior hurling team. He is usually deployed as a corner-forward.

Career
Stakelum made his league debut for Tipperary on 5 February 2022 against Laois when he came on as a substitute in the second half.

Honours

Tipperary
All-Ireland Under-21 Hurling Championship (1): 2018
All-Ireland Minor Hurling Championship (1): 2016
Munster Minor Hurling Championship (1): 2016

References 

Living people
Thurles Sarsfields hurlers
Tipperary inter-county hurlers
Year of birth missing (living people)